De Winter is a Dutch surname. It may refer to:

De Winter or de Winter:
Alfons De Winter (1908–1997), Belgian footballer
Allister de Winter (born 1968), Australian cricketer
Arie de Winter (born 1954), Dutch writer and columnist
August De Winter (1925–2005), Belgian politician
Bernard de Winter (born 1924), South African botanist
Brenno de Winter (born 1971), Dutch technology and investigative journalist
Jan Willem de Winter (1761–1812), Dutch admiral of the Napoleonic Wars
Jo De Winter (1914–2004), American television actress
Koni De Winter (born 2002), Belgian footballer
Leon de Winter (born 1954), Dutch writer and columnist
Ludwig De Winter (born 1992), Belgian racing cyclist
Melise de Winter (born 1968), Dutch voice actress
Solomonica de Winter (born 1997), Dutch writer
Yves De Winter (born 1987), Belgian football goalkeeper

Dewinter or deWinter:
Filip Dewinter (born 1962), Belgian Flemish nationalist politician
Simon Dewinter (1908–1972), Belgian boxer

Fictional characters
Milady de Winter, antagonist in the novel The Three Musketeers (1844) by Alexandre Dumas
 Three characters in Daphne du Maurier's 1938 novel Rebecca, its 1940 film adaptation, and Susan Hill's 1993 sequel novel Mrs de Winter:
 Maximillian de Winter, owner of Manderley
 Rebecca de Winter, unseen titular character and Max's deceased first wife
 Mrs. de Winter, narrator of the original novel and Max's second wife

See also
Winter (disambiguation)
Winter (surname)
Winters (surname)

Dutch-language surnames
Surnames from nicknames
fr:Dewinter